Wolfsburg is a city in Lower Saxony, Germany

Wolfsburg may also refer to:

 Wolfsburg Castle, in the city of Wolfsburg
 Wolfsburg (film), film 
 Wolfsburg AG, a German company headquartered in Wolfsburg
 Wolfsburg-Unkeroda, a former municipality in the Wartburgkreis district of Thuringia, Germany
 VfL Wolfsburg, an association football team based in the German city of the same name

See also 
 Wolfsberg (disambiguation)